Maxi 77 is a  sailboat class designed by Pelle Petterson and built in about 3,750 copies.

History
The Maxi 77 designed by Pelle Petterson was built by Mölnlycke Marin between 1972 and 1982.

References

1970s sailboat type designs
Sailboat type designs by Swedish designers
Keelboats
Sailboat types built in Sweden
Sailing yachts designed by Pelle Pettersson